Five for Hell (also known as Five Into Hell) is a 1969 Italian "macaroni combat" war film starring John Garko, Margaret Lee and Klaus Kinski. Italian cinema specialist Howard Hughes referred to it as a derivative of The Dirty Dozen (1967).

Summary
Gianni Garko is a fun-loving leader of a bunch of oddball G.I.s whose mission is to steal the German's secret attack plans from a villa behind enemy lines, where they run into a brutal Nazi commander.

This film introduced, as it was typical in spaghetti combat films, a very particular and self parodic humour, using also elements inherited directly from the Spaghetti Western, such as the hero using eccentric and odd weaponry, such as an iron baseball.

Cast
 Gianni Garko - Lt. Glenn Hoffmann (as John Garko)
 Margaret Lee - Helga Richter
 Klaus Kinski - SS-Obersturmbannführer Hans Müller
 Aldo Canti - Nick Amadori (as Nick Jordan)
 Sal Borgese - Al Siracusa
 Luciano Rossi - Johnny 'Chicken' White
 Samson Burke - Sgt. Sam McCarthy (as Sam Burke)
 Irio Fantini - Maj. Gen. Friedrich Gerbordstadt
 Biagio Gambini - Helga's Lover (uncredited)
 Mike Monty - Capt. Nixon (uncredited)
 Bill Vanders - American General (uncredited)

References

External links

Italian World War II films
1969 films
1960s Italian-language films
1960s war drama films
1960s action films
Films directed by Gianfranco Parolini
Macaroni Combat films
Italian war drama films
World War II films based on actual events
1969 drama films
1960s Italian films